Ollerton is a small village, located in the parish of Stoke upon Tern in Shropshire, England.

Ollerton is located in a rural area approximately midway between the towns of Telford and Market Drayton; immediately to the west is the hamlet of Peplow, while Child's Ercall lies to the east.

See also
Listed buildings in Stoke upon Tern

External links 

Villages in Shropshire